The Settimo Torinese–Pont Canavese railway is a railway linking the comuni (municipalities) of Settimo Torinese and Pont Canavese in the Metropolitan City of Turin in Piedmont, north Italy.

Settimo railway station is an interchange with the Turin-Milan railway, owned by Trenitalia.

History
The Settimo–Pont Canavese railway was, amongst other infrastructures, part of a plan to improve the Piedmontese economy started by Doc. Carlo Demaria, mayor Giuseppe Recrosio and entrepreneurs Giuseppe Chiesa and Fortunato Pistono. Construction started in 1856 by Società Anonima della Strada Ferrata del Canavese.

Due to the line not being profitable enough, Società Anonima per la Strada Ferrata e le Tranvie del Canavese took over the construction of the railway, rebuilding it from scratch to standard gauge . In 1906 the line was completed, successfully contributing to the area's economical development.

On 1 March 2002, the Settimo–Rivarolo section of the line was fully electrified.

The Cuorgnè–Pont Canavese section of the line was closed due to a flood in 2000.

References

Railway lines in Piedmont
Settimo Torinese